The Micromax In 1B is an Android smartphone developed by the Indian Smartphone manufacturer Micromax Informatics. It is the part of In series by Micromax announced on November 3, 2020, and released on November 24, 2020. The In 1B, along with Micromax IN Note 1, marked the re-entry of the company into the Indian smartphone market after years of little or no activity.

Specifications

Hardware 
The In 1B is powered by a MediaTek Helio G35 SoC, including octa-core 2.3 GHz CPU, and PowerVR GE8320 GPU. The internal storage configurations have two options of 32 GB or 64 GB with 2 GB and 4 GB RAM respectively.

The phone comes with a 6.52-inch touchscreen display with a resolution of 720x1600 pixels and an aspect ratio of 20:9. It is powered by a 5000mAh non-removable battery. The Micromax In 1b supports 10W fast charging via a USB Type-C interface. It also has a Fingerprint Scanner on the back.

Software 
The In 1B is originally shipped with Android 10 in the 4GB RAM variant and Go Edition of the Android 10 for the 2GB RAM variant. It runs the stock Android UI with some features added by Micromax.

Camera 
The Micromax In 1b on the rear comes with a 13 MP primary camera with an f/1.8 aperture, and a 2 MP micro camera featuring Phase Detection Autofocus, ISO control and Exposure compensation. It has an 8 megapixel camera on the front with a fixed focus for selfies. It also supports high dynamic range (HDR) imaging.

References 

Mobile phones introduced in 2020
Micromax Mobile
Mobile phones with multiple rear cameras